Ann Aschengrau is an epidemiologist who focuses on environmental and reproductive health. She is a professor of epidemiology at Boston University School of Public Health and is the Associate Chairman of the department.

Career
Aschengrau is the lead investigator of a cohort study examining the impact of environmental and social stressors on substance use. She led the study of the effects of tetrachloroethylene (PCE) in Cape Cod, Massachusetts water pipes (from 1969 to 1983) which in 2014, found an increased likelihood of stillbirths and other pregnancy issues.

Education
Harvard University, ScD, epidemiology 1987
Northeastern University, BA
Harvard University, SM/ScM

Publications
Essentials of Epidemiology in Public Health textbook; coauthor George R. Seage III Harvard T.H. Chan School of Public Health

References

External links

Northeastern University alumni
Harvard School of Public Health alumni
Boston University School of Public Health faculty
American women epidemiologists
Year of birth missing (living people)
Living people
21st-century American women